The Fiat 518, also called Fiat Ardita, was a model of car produced by Italian car manufacturer Fiat between 1933 and 1938. The name "Ardita" was also used on the six-cylinder engined and more expensive Fiat Ardita 2500 or 527.

In total 8,794 518s were produced by Fiat. Additionally the 518 was produced outside Italy: in France by Simca as Simca-Fiat 11 CV, and in Poland by Polski Fiat as well as by PZInż under licence.

Models

Ardita and Ardita 2000
The Ardita with available two chassis, having different wheelbases. Furthermore, there was a choice of two engines, the standard 1.8-litre (Ardita, also known as Ardita 1750) and a 2.0-litre version (Ardita 2000).

The short  wheelbase chassis was coded 518 C (for corta, short) and the long ( one 518 L (for lunga, long). Suspension and braking were fairly conventional, with solid axles front and rear, hydraulic dampers, hydraulic drum brakes on all four wheels and a band handbrake on the transmission. The 518 L chassis was fitted with wider tyres (5.50×17″ instead of 5.25×17″) and a different final drive ratio from the 518 C.
Both the 518 C and 518 L were offered from the factory with 4-door saloon and 4-door torpedo bodies.
Therefore, the factory body styles available for the standard Ardita and the Ardita 2000 were:
 Saloon, 4 doors, 7 seats, long chassis
 Saloon, 4 doors, 5 seats, short chassis
 Torpedo, 4 doors, long chassis
 Torpedo, 4 doors, short chassis
The saloons had 6 side windows, lacked a centre pillar and had suicide doors at the rear.

With a 6.2:1 compression ratio and a single Zenith 36 VIF carburettor it produced . Top speed was  respectively for the 518 C and 518 L saloons.
With unchanged compression ratio and carburettor it produced  at 3,600 rpm.

Ardita Coloniale
The Ardita Coloniale was a variant of the Ardita 2000 for use in the Italian colonies or by the military. The Coloniale was produced both with short and long wheelbase, as well as with both saloon and torpedo bodies.

Ardita Sport
The Fiat Ardita Sport was a more powerful variant of the Ardita 2000 using the short-wheelbase (2.7 m) chassis. It was offered from the factory solely as a 4-door, 4-window pillarless sports saloon, with four seats and an external luggage compartment integrated in the body. It was fitted as standard with wire wheels, and the spare wheel was carried at the rear.

Production outside Italy

Simca-Fiat

In Poland
A Polish version, the Polski Fiat 518 Mazur was produced between 1937 and 1939 by PZInż in Warszawa under Fiat license. The car has 4 doors and 7 or 5 seats. It used the two-litre Fiat 118 engine (PZInż 157) (45 hp (33 kW) at 3,600 rpm, compression rate of 6,1:1) and a four-speed gearbox.
The 518-derived PZInż 302 was used as artillery tractor by the Polish military.

References

Notes

Bibliography

 

518
1930s cars
Cars introduced in 1933
Science and technology in Poland